SM City Baliwag is a shopping mall in the Philippines owned, developed and operated by SM Prime Holdings. It is the second SM Supermalls in Bulacan province after SM City Marilao, the 3rd and last SM Mall among the company's expansion in 2008 and the 33rd SM Mall in the list. The mall is located at DRT Highway, Brgy. Pagala, Baliwag. It opened on December 12, 2008.

Mall Features
The two-level shopping mall will have the 2 main anchors. Families will have fun eating out at the mall's food court, international and local fastfood chains and restaurants. It will have four state-of-the-art cinemas. SM City Baliwag's design and construction team includes DSGN Associates, mall designers; Jose Siao Ling and Associates, architect of record; New Golden City Builders, general contractors; and DA Abcede and Associates, project manager.

References

 

Shopping malls in Bulacan
Shopping malls established in 2008
SM Prime